In mathematical analysis, the Alexandrov theorem, named after Aleksandr Danilovich Aleksandrov, states that if  is an open subset of  and  is a convex function, then  has a second derivative almost everywhere.

In this context, having a second derivative at a point means having a second-order Taylor expansion at that point with a local error smaller than any quadratic.

The result is closely related to Rademacher's theorem.

References

 
 

Theorems in measure theory